Aghdzk is a village in the Ashtarak Municipality of the Aragatsotn Province of Armenia. It is home to the Arshakid Mausoleum, a large grave monument complex and basilica of the 4th to 5th centuries. King Shapur II of Persia exhumed the bones of the Armenian kings and took them to Persia symbolically taking Armenia's power. When Sparapet Vassak Mamikonian defeated the Persians and reclaimed the bones of the Arshakuni monarchs, he buried them at Aghdzk. Remains of the monuments and the basilica may still to be seen.

Aghdzk is the birthplace of Catholicos Komitas I of Armenia (6th century-628).

Gallery

References 
 
 World Gazetteer: Armenia – World-Gazetteer.com
 Report of the results of the 2001 Armenian Census
 Kiesling, Rediscovering Armenia, p. 16, available online at the US embassy to Armenia's website

Populated places in Aragatsotn Province